Jugenheim in Rheinhessen is an Ortsgemeinde – a municipality belonging to a Verbandsgemeinde, a kind of collective municipality – in the Mainz-Bingen district in Rhineland-Palatinate, Germany.

Geography

Location
Jugenheim lies in the middle among Mainz, Bingen, Alzey and Bad Kreuznach in Rhenish Hesse. The winegrowing centre belongs to the Verbandsgemeinde of Nieder-Olm, whose seat is in the like-named town.

History
In 767, Jugenheim had its first documentary mention as Gaginheim. Since 1987, Jugenheim has been a recognized village renewal municipality (Dorferneuerungsgemeinde).

The synagogue in Jugenheim was burned on Kristalnacht but the Torah scroll was rescued from the burning building and later smuggled to the United States. It is now held by Temple B'nai Israel in Oklahoma City.

Politics

Town council
The council is made up of 17 council members, counting the part-time mayor, with seats apportioned thus:

(as at municipal election held on 13 June 2004)

Town partnerships
 Oberhoffen-sur-Moder, Bas-Rhin, France

Coat of arms
The municipality's arms might be described thus: Azure semy of crosses argent a lion rampant of the second armed, langued and crowned gules.

Culture and sightseeing

Buildings
Saint Martin's Church (Martinskirche, Evangelical) was consecrated in 1775 and with seating for 1,000 worshippers is one of Rhenish Hesse's biggest churches. Its Wegmann organ from 1762 together with the original organ balustrade comes from the old Welschnonnenkirche – once a convent church, now no longer standing – in Mainz.

Sport
 Three outdoor tennis courts
 The tennis hall built in 1999 with two courts
 Sport complex with natural-grass field
 Riding square with riding hall
 Beach volleyball field (built in 2005)
 Boule lane
 Jugenheim's football club is TuS 1899 Jugenheim.

References

External links
 Municipality’s official webpage 

Municipalities in Rhineland-Palatinate
Mainz-Bingen